Elise Maree Rechichi OAM (born 11 January 1986) is an Australian sailor from Perth, Western Australia. Rechichi and crewmate Tessa Parkinson represented Australia in the 470 class at the 2008 Summer Olympics in Qingdao, Shandong, China, winning the gold medal. She was an Australian Institute of Sport scholarship holder.

Reichichi is married to racing driver Karl Reindler, and they have two children.

References

External links
 
 
 
 
 

1986 births
Living people
Australian Institute of Sport sailors
Australian female sailors (sport)
Sailors at the 2008 Summer Olympics – 470
Sailors at the 2012 Summer Olympics – 470
Olympic sailors of Australia
Olympic gold medalists for Australia
Recipients of the Medal of the Order of Australia
Olympic medalists in sailing
People educated at Methodist Ladies' College, Perth
Medalists at the 2008 Summer Olympics
420 class world champions
World champions in sailing for Australia
21st-century Australian women